is a retired Japanese artistic gymnast. He competed at the 1972 Olympics and won a gold medal with the Japanese team. Individually he won a silver on parallel bars and bronze medals on the floor and horizontal bar. Kasamatsu won six world titles in 1974 and 1978. The Kasamatsu vault is named after him. In 2006, he was inducted into the International Gymnastics Hall of Fame. His wife Kazue Hanyu and son Akihiro Kasamatsu are also retired Olympic gymnasts.

Kasamatsu took up gymnastics in 1957, but had his first major achievement only in 1970, when he finished second all-around in the Chunichi Cup. He had to withdraw from the 1976 Olympics due to an emergency appendectomy.

References

External links 
 Kasamatsu(Vault)
 

 

1947 births
Living people
Japanese male artistic gymnasts
Originators of elements in artistic gymnastics
Gymnasts at the 1972 Summer Olympics
Olympic gymnasts of Japan
Olympic gold medalists for Japan
Olympic medalists in gymnastics
Medalists at the 1972 Summer Olympics
Medalists at the World Artistic Gymnastics Championships
Olympic silver medalists for Japan
Olympic bronze medalists for Japan
Recipients of the Medal with Purple Ribbon
20th-century Japanese people
21st-century Japanese people